The Pacific least gecko (Sphaerodactylus pacificus) is a species of lizard in the family Sphaerodactylidae. It is endemic to Cocos Island.

References

Sphaerodactylus
Reptiles of Costa Rica
Endemic fauna of Costa Rica
Reptiles described in 1903